Because of That War (Biglal Hamilkhama Hahi) is a feature-length Hebrew-language documentary about Yehuda Poliker and Ya'akov Gilad, the sons of Holocaust survivors.

History
The movie, which came out in 1988, was written and directed by Orna Ben-Dor Niv. 

It was shown in Germany under the title Wegen dieses Krieges.

See also
Israeli cinema

References

External links

Documentary films about Jews and Judaism
1988 films
Israeli documentary films
1988 documentary films